The following is a timeline of the city of Praia, capital of Cape Verde.

Colonial era

1460 - The island of Santiago was discovered by António de Noli on behalf of the Portuguese.
1516 - First mention of the village of Praia de Santa Maria
1520s - Praia officially became a town (vila)
1585 - Capture of Santiago (1585), Praia razed by English corsair Sir Francis Drake
1712 - Cassard expedition, Praia razed by French Navy
1770 - Seat of civil and military government transferred from Ribeira Grande (now Cidade Velha) to Praia

1781 - April 16: As part of the Anglo-French War (1778–1783), the marine Battle of Porto Praya took place off Praia
1821 - May: Riots in Praia instigated by Manuel António Martins who overthrew António Pusich as colonial governor
1826 - Quartel Jaime Mota barracks built
1832 - As part of his voyage aboard , Charles Darwin visited the island of Santiago and Praia 
1858 - Praia officially became a city (cidade)
1876 - Complete abolition of slavery in Cape Verde

1902 - Church of Nossa Senhora da Graça (current Praia Cathedral) completed
1940 - Population: 18,208
1950 - Population: 17,179
1960s - Construction of a new port east of the city centre
1960: 
 Population: 24,872
 Liceu Nacional da Praia (current Liceu Domingos Ramos) established
1961 - Praia Airport opened 
1970 - Population: 39,911 
1971 - Two northern parishes of the municipality of Praia were separated to form the new municipality of Santa Cruz
1974 - April: the Carnation Revolution took place in Portugal, the Estado Novo regime collapsed, Cape Verde became an autonomous province

Independent Cape Verde after 1975
1975 - July 5: Cape Verde declared independence from Portugal and became an independent nation, Praia became the national capital
1979 - July 28: The first institute of higher education in Cape Verde, Curso de Formação de Professores do Ensino Secundário (CFPES) was established in Praia. It is part of the University of Cape Verde since 2006.
1980 - Population: 57,748
1988 - December 31: The National Historic Archives of Cape Verde were established
1990 - Population: 71,276

1996 - Two northern parishes of the municipality of Praia were separated to form the new municipality of São Domingos
1997 - November: Museu Etnográfico (Ethnographic Museum) established
1998 - May: Bolsa de Valores de Cabo Verde (Cape Verde Stock Exchange) established
1999 - National Library of Cape Verde established
2000 - Population 106,052
2001 - Jean Piaget University of Cape Verde established
2005
Two western parishes of the municipality of Praia were separated to form the new municipality of Ribeira Grande de Santiago
October: New Praia Airport opened
2006 - November: University of Cape Verde established
2010 - Population: 131,719
2012 - The Universidade de Santiago opened a campus in Praia (in the Prainha subdivision)
2015 - National Auditorium of Cape Verde completed

See also
 Timeline of Portuguese Cape Verde

References

Praia
History of Santiago, Cape Verde
Cape Verdean history timelines
Santiago, Cape Verde-related lists
Praia
Praia